Lelo     is the oldest Sports newspaper in Georgia. It was founded in 1934 as the Georgian Athlete and was later remained as Lelo.

References

Mass media in Tbilisi
Georgian-language newspapers
Newspapers published in Georgia (country)